Millersport may refer to:

Millersport, Indiana, an unincorporated community in Dubois County
Millersport, New York, a hamlet in the town of Clarence in Erie County
Millersport, Ohio, a village in Fairfield County
Millersport, Lawrence County, Ohio